The 1987–88 St. Louis Blues season was the St. Louis Blues' 21st season in the National Hockey League (NHL).

Offseason

Regular season

The Blues allowed the fewest short-handed goals during the regular season, with just 5.

Final standings

Schedule and results

Playoffs

Player statistics

Regular season
Scoring

Goaltending

Playoffs
Scoring

Goaltending

Awards and records

Transactions

Draft picks
St. Louis's draft picks at the 1987 NHL Entry Draft held at the Joe Louis Arena in Detroit, Michigan. The Blues attempted to select Tim Foley in the second round of the 1987 NHL Supplemental Draft, but the claim was ruled invalid since Foley entered school after age 20 and therefore did not meet eligibility requirements.

Farm teams

See also
1987–88 NHL season

References

 
 Blues on Hockey Database

External links

St.
St.
St. Louis Blues seasons
National Hockey League All-Star Game hosts
St Louis
St Louis